Ragály is a village in Borsod-Abaúj-Zemplén County in northeastern Hungary. Name of the village has probably slavic origin.

Reformed Church 
Gothic church belonging to the Reformed Church from 12.-13. century is standing in the village. It contains medieval frescoes and it was restored few years ago.

References

Populated places in Borsod-Abaúj-Zemplén County